"Horny '98" is a house song by German producer Mousse T. featuring British pop duo Hot 'n' Juicy with vocals provided by Inaya Day. It was released in May 1998 and reached number two on the UK Singles Chart in the following month, staying on the chart for 17 weeks. The song also reached number one in Italy, number two in New Zealand, and number five in Ireland. It was later included on the South Park soundtrack album Chef Aid: The South Park Album (1998).

In 2006, a mash-up of the song with "Bohemian Like You" by the Dandy Warhols—titled "Horny as a Dandy"—reached number 17 on the UK Singles Chart, number 14 in Austria, and number 10 in Italy.

Release and performance
Originally called "Horny Track", which was produced with a trumpet sample from Earth, Wind & Fire's 1983 song "Something Special", the single was actually first released as an instrumental in 1997 on a limited edition vinyl 12-inch single as a little "present" for fellow club DJs. But the 1998 remake was given a commercial edge after adding vocals by duo Emma Lanford and Nadine Richardson, with Inaya Day, working under the name Hot'N'Juicy (although only Emma Southam and Nadine Richardson appear in the music video and on the sleeve). Italian house music fans were the first to pick up on the record.

The single reached number one on the singles chart in Italy and became a massive summer hit. Then the track reached the top position on the German dance chart after some seven weeks. It also peaked at number two in the UK, number three in Scotland, number five in Ireland, number nine in Norway, number 11 in Switzerland and number 12 in Iceland. On the Eurochart Hot 100, "Horny '98" reached number six in June 1998. Outside Europe, it peaked at number two in New Zealand, number 12 on the Billboard Hot Dance Singles Sales chart in the US and number 13 in Australia. Two very similar music videos were made for the song.

Critical reception
Chuck Taylor from Billboard wrote, "As one of many highlights on the new South Park collection, 'Horny' has the potential to be the novelty smash of the season." He added further, "With lyrics that are ultra-self-explanatory, 'Horny' will either bring a giddy smile or a look of disdain. While it has been wholly embraced by club pundits who tend to appreciate anything cheeky and suggestive, those at radio may find themselves more comfortable distancing themselves from it. Of course, carefree, adventurous types will see 'Horny' as the best thing to come down the pike since Rice Krispies treats. Better yet, perhaps they will simply look to European radio—which treated this as a full-fledged pop record—and turn it into a major hit." 

An editor from Daily Record called it a "raunchy R&B hit", and "this year's catchiest summer anthem so far." Pan-European magazine Music & Media opined that the music is "tough and sexy with a tight disco beat, screeching horns and an appropriately smouldering vocal. The shadow of Gloria Gaynor looms very, very large over this tune but that's no bad thing..." They also declared the song as a "perfect dance/pop crossover". Mike Goldsmith from NME described it as "such screamingly familiar ear candy". Dave Fawbert from ShortList wrote, "Completing 1998's sexy one-two, this is the sound of Jumpin' Jaks in Romford in the summer of 1998: the sound of carefree youth, shots for a pound, dancing on the tables and fights outside McDonald's. Wonderful."

Impact and legacy
Tomorrowland featured "Horny '98" in their official list of "The Ibiza 500" in 2020.

Hot 'n' Juicy
Hot 'n' Juicy were initially a duo of singers, Emma Lanford and Nadine Richardson. They appeared on the 1998 version of "Horny" and the 2006 mash up "Horny as a Dandy". They were residents of a tower block on the former Lee Bank estate in Birmingham. They became a trio in late 1998 when they were joined by Nikki Belle, who remained in the group until 1999. After the group split up, Belle went on to provide vocals on a version of Womack & Womack's "Teardrops" for Whelan & Di Scala, an English EDM duo.

South Park version
The song was later included on the South Park soundtrack album Chef Aid: The South Park Album. On Chef Aid, the song opens with a mock phone call between Sid Greenfield (voiced by Trey Parker) and South Park creators, Matt Stone and Trey Parker, talking about putting the song on the album. In the mock phone call (which begins on the previous track, and continues throughout "Horny") Matt and Trey repeatedly voice their dislike for the song, and Sid Greenfield finally agrees not to include it (this being after the song has already finished playing in its entirety).

Track listings

 German CD single
 "Horny '98" (radio edit) – 3:57
 "Horny '98" (Boris Gets Horny radio edit) – 2:55
 "Horny '98" (extended mix) – 6:21
 "Horny '98" (Boris Gets Horny extended mix) – 9:11
 "Horny" (original mix) – 5:14

 German 12-inch single
A1. "Horny '98" (extended mix) – 6:21
A2. "Horny" (original mix) – 5:14
B1. "Horny '98" (Boris Gets Horny extended mix) – 9:11
B2. "Horny '98" (radio edit) – 3:57

 European CD single
 "Horny '98" (radio edit) – 3:57
 "Horny '98" (extended mix) – 6:21

 UK, Australian, and New Zealand CD single
 "Horny" (Boris Gets Edited)
 "Horny '98" (radio edit)
 "Horny '98" (extended mix)
 "Horny" (Boris Gets Horny mix)
 "Horny" (original mix)
 "Horny" (Elusive dub 1)

 UK 12-inch single
A1. "Horny" (Boris Gets Horny mix)
A2. "Horny" (original mix)
AA1. "Horny '98" (extended mix)
AA2. "Horny" (Elusive dub 1)

 UK cassette single
A1. "Horny '98" (radio edit)
A2. "Horny" (Boris Gets Edited)
B1. "Horny '98" (extended mix)

 US CD and cassette single
 "Horny" – 3:47
 "Horny" (Tiefschwarz Gets Horny instrumental mix) – 7:12
 "Mentally Dull" by Vitro featuring the cast of South Park (Think Tank remix) – 3:45

 US maxi-CD single
 "Horny" – 3:47
 "Horny" (Mousse T.'s extended mix) – 6:15
 "Horny" (Hamburg Gets Horny mix) – 9:11
 "Horny" (D.Y.M.K. dub) – 7:38
 "Horny" (Tiefschwarz Gets Horny mix) – 7:12
 "Horny" (Fused mix) – 5:32
 "Horny" (a cappella) – 3:47

 US 12-inch single
A1. "Horny" (Mousse T.'s extended mix) – 6:15
A2. "Horny" (Hamburg Gets Horny mix) – 9:11
B1. "Horny" (Tiefschwarz Gets Horny mix) – 7:12
B2. "Horny" (Fused mix) – 5:32
B3. "Horny" (a cappella) – 3:47

Charts

Weekly charts

Year-end charts

Certifications

Release history

"Horny as a Dandy"

In 2006, a mash-up between "Horny" and the Dandy Warhols' song "Bohemian Like You" was released as "Horny as a Dandy", featuring vocals from Hot 'n' Juicy. The mash-up was released in Germany on 17 March 2006 and was issued throughout the world in mid-2006. The song peaked at number 17 on the UK Singles Chart, number 13 in Austria, and number 10 in Italy. Two versions of the song appear on the first CD single: the original mash-up version produced by Loo & Placido and a new version produced by Mousse T. featuring a re-recorded sample of "Bohemian Like You" with the Dandy Warhols providing the vocals and instrumentation.

Charts

Release history

Cover versions
 In 2016, Australians Potbelleez and Zoë Badwi released a version as a single.

References

1997 songs
1998 singles
2006 singles
AM PM Records singles
The Dandy Warhols songs
Edel AG singles
Mashup songs
Mousse T. songs
Number-one singles in Italy
Songs written by Courtney Taylor-Taylor